World Without God is the debut album by Finnish death metal band, Convulse. It was originally released on Thrash Records in 1991.

It was re-released by Eternal Darkness Productions in a limited print also containing the "Resuscitation Of Evilness" demo, a rehearsal from 1990 featuring the tracks "Godless Truth" and "Powerstruggle Of Belief" as well as a live cover of Venom's "Countess Bathory" taken from the "Live In Pain" bootleg.

It was re-released again, this time by Relapse Records in 2010 with Resuscitation Of Evilness demo and live songs Countess Bathory and Incantation Of Restoration as bonus tracks. It is also available in limited vinyl of the following colours:
500 black
100 clear.

Track listing

1992 debut albums
Convulse (band) albums
Relapse Records albums